Francis Barrell may refer to:
 Francis Barrell (died 1679) (c. 1627–1679), English politician, MP for Rochester
 Francis Barrell (1662–1724), English politician, MP for Rochester